The Montreal Trust Company was formed in 1889 and 100 years later described itself as "one of Canada's largest trust companies."

History

Montreal Trust was founded by the Bank of Montreal. Donald Smith and Edward Clouston were amongst its charter board of directors.

In 1994, Scotiabank acquired Montreal Trust. The stock transfer and corporate trust businesses of Montreal Trust were acquired by Computershare in 2000.

References

Bibliography
 

Trust companies of Canada
Defunct financial services companies of Canada
Scotiabank
Mortgage lenders of Canada
1889 establishments in Quebec
Financial services companies established in 1889
Financial services companies disestablished in 1994
1994 disestablishments in Quebec
Canadian companies established in 1889